The 1979 Belgian Grand Prix was a Formula One motor race held on 13 May 1979 at Zolder. It was the sixth race of the 1979 World Championship of F1 Drivers and the 1979 International Cup for F1 Constructors.

The 70-lap race was won by Jody Scheckter, driving a Ferrari. Jacques Laffite finished second in a Ligier-Ford, having started from pole position, while Didier Pironi achieved his first podium finish with third in a Tyrrell-Ford.

The race also saw the first appearance of Alfa Romeo as a works team since . Driving the Alfa Romeo 177, Bruno Giacomelli qualified 14th, ahead of both Renaults and both McLarens, before retiring following a collision with Elio de Angelis in the Shadow-Ford.

Qualifying

Qualifying classification

Race

Classification

Championship standings after the race

Drivers' Championship standings

Constructors' Championship standings

References

Belgian Grand Prix
Belgian Grand Prix
Grand Prix
Circuit Zolder